Kuzbass Kemerovo may refer to the following teams based or formerly based in Kemerovo, Russia:
 FC Kuzbass Kemerovo, an association football club
 Kuzbass Kemerovo Bandy Club, a bandy club
 VC Kuzbass Kemerovo, a volleyball club